Daniel is one of the most common given names. People named Daniel, as well as informal forms like "Dan" and "Danny", include:

Dan
 Dan Auerbach, lead guitarist and vocalist of The Black Keys and The Arcs
 Dan Andriano, bassist in American punk band Alkaline Trio
 Dan Avidan, (born 1979) American singer Internet personality
 Dan Aykroyd, (born 1952), Canadian-American actor
 Dan Balan (born 1979), Moldovan singer
 Dan Bilzerian, US Internet personality and gambler
 Dan Beard (1850–1941), founder of the Sons of Daniel Boone
 Dan Ben-Amotz (1924–89), Israeli writer, journalist, screenwriter, and actor
 Dan Brown, American author, writer of The Da Vinci Code among others
 Dan Bunz (born 1955), American football player
 Dan Butler (born 1954), American actor
 Dan "Soupy" Campbell, vocalist of The Wonder Years (band)
 Dan Carden (born 1986), British politician
 Dan Carter, New Zealand professional Rugby Union player
 Dan Cassidy, (born 1961), former professional tennis player
 Dan Castellaneta, American actor, voice of Homer Simpson
 Dan Chisena (born 1997), American football player
 Dan Coats, US senator, director of national intelligence, and ambassador to Germany
 Daniel Conahan (born 1954), American convicted murderer and rapist
 Dan Coulter, Canadian politician; MLA from British Columbia
 Dan Cruickshank, British architectural historian and television presenter
 Dan Curry, visual effects producer (known for Star Trek series of movies and TV shows)
 Dan Daniel, American sportswriter
 Dan Deacon, American electronic musician
 Dan Debicella, Connecticut State Senator
 Dan DeCarlo, American cartoonist
 Dan Doubiago (born 1960), American football player
 Dan Dries, American ice hockey player
 Dan Flynn, American politician
 Dan Fogelberg (1951–2007), American singer-songwriter
 Dan Gadzuric (born 1978), Dutch basketball player
 Dan Gheesling, television personality
 Dan Glickman, president of the Motion Picture Association of America, former US Secretary of Agriculture
 Dan Green, American voice actor
 Dan Grunfeld, American professional basketball player
 Dan Gurney, American racing car driver
 Dan Hageman (born 1976), American screenwriter and television producer
 Dan Harmon (born 1973), American actor, producer, and writer
 Dan Hartman (1950–1994), American singer-songwriter
 Dan Hicks (singer) (1941–2016), American singer-songwriter
 Dan Hodges, British journalist
 Dan Howell, British YouTube vlogger and radio presenter
 Dan Huberty, American politician
 Dan Jansen, American speed skater, Olympic gold medalist
 Dan Kaminsky, (1979-2021), American computer security researcher
 Dan Kearns, Canadian football player
 Dan Kellner, American champion foil fencer
 Dan Kowarsky, Canadian singer, B4-4/RyanDan
 Dan Kurzius (born 1971/1972), American billionaire, co-founder of Mailchimp
 Dan Kutler, American-born Israeli Olympic swimmer
 Dan Lambton, vocalist of Real Friends
 Dan Leal, American pornographic actor and director
 Dan MacKenzie, Canadian sports and business executive
 Dan Majerle, American basketball player
 Dan Marino, American football player
 Dan Melville (born 1956), American football player
 Dan Meyerstein (born 1938), Israeli president of Ariel University
 Dan Miceli, American baseball player
 Dan Mintz, American comedian and voice actor
 Dan O'Bannon (1946–2009), American filmmaker
 Dan Orlovsky, American football player
 Dan Peek (1950–2011), American musician
 Dan Petrescu (disambiguation)
 Dan Petronijevic (born 1981), Canadian voice actor
 Dan Povenmire (born 1963), American animator
 Dan Rather, American journalist and news anchor
 Dan Reeves, American football player and head coach
 Dan Ryczek (born 1949), American football player
 Dan Salvato, indie video game developer
 Dan Savage, American sex columnist
 Dan Schneider (disambiguation)
 Dan Seals (1948–2009), American musician
 Dan Shilon, Israeli journalist, announcer, and TV presenter
 Dan Slott (born 1967), American comic book writer
 Dan Smith (singer), singer in Bastille
 Dan Snow, British television presenter
 Dan Ticktum (born 1999), British racing driver
 Dan Tiernan (fl. 2020 - ), English stand-up comedian
 Dan Travers (born 1956), Scottish badminton player
 Dan Weinstein, American 3x world champion speed skater
 Dan Wells, American author, writer of the John Cleaver Trilogy among others
 Dan White, assassinated San Francisco Mayor George Moscone and Supervisor Harvey Milk

Mononym or stage name
 DJ Dan (born Daniel Wherrett), America

Dani
 Dani Pedrosa, Spanish motorcycle racer
 Dani Rodrik, Harvard economist

Daniyal/Danyal/Danial
 Prince Daniyal, Prince of Mughal Empire and son of Emperor Akbar the Great
 Daniyal Akhmetov, former Prime Minister of Kazakhstan
 Daniyal Zahid, Pakistani cricketer
 Danial Hakimi, Iranian film, TV, stage and radio director and actor
 Danial Fadzly Abdullah, Malaysian former football player
 Danial Mahini, Iranian football player

Daniel

Mononym
 Daniel (biblical figure), the hero of the biblical Book of Daniel. A noble Jewish youth of Jerusalem, he is taken into captivity by Nebuchadnezzar of Babylon and serves the king and his successors with loyalty and ability until the time of the Persian conqueror Cyrus, all the while remaining true to the God of Israel.
 Daniel (Montenegrin singer), stage name of Milan Popović, Montenegro-born singer
 Daniel (Brazilian singer), stage name of José Daniel Camillo, Brazilian sertanejo singer, originally part of sertanejo duo João Paulo & Daniel
 Daniel (footballer, born 1961), footballer who played as a defender
 Daniel (monk), 5th-century Egyptian Christian monk
 Daniel of Moscow (1261—1303), prince, forefather of all the Grand Princes of Moscow in Russia
 Prince Daniel, Duke of Västergötland (born 1973), Swedish prince
 Daniel of Padua, 2nd-century Italian martyr
 Daniel of Persia, 4th-century Persian martyr

Given name
 Daniel Abt, German racing driver
 Daniel Adair, Canadian drummer
 Daniel Agger, Danish international footballer, formerly of Liverpool
 Daniel Agina, Kenyan football defender 
 Daniel Ahn (a.k.a. Niel), South Korean singer-songwriter, actor and member of boy group Teen Top
 Daniel Alfredsson, Swedish retired hockey player
 Daniel Alvarado (1949–2020), Venezuelan actor
 Daniel Alves, Brazilian international footballer, currently playing for Paris Saint-Germain
 Daniel Ançay (born 1970), retired Swiss football goalkeeper
 Daniel Andersson, one of several people
 Daniel Andrews, 48th Premier of Victoria, Australia.
 Daniel Anthony, British actor
 Daniel Aranzubia, Spanish association football player
 Daniel arap Moi, (1924–2020), 2nd President of Kenya
 Daniel Armand Lee (a.k.a. Tablo), Korean-Canadian hip hop artist, songwriter, lyricist and member of Epik High
 Daniel Bailey, sprinter from Antigua and Barbuda
 Daniel Camargo Barbosa (1930–1994), prolific Colombian serial killer and rapist
 Daniel Barenboim, Argentine-Israeli pianist and conductor
 Daniel Bennett (born 1978), Singaporean footballer
 Daniel Bentley (disambiguation)
 Daniel Berger (born 1993), American professional PGA Tour golfer
 Daniel Bernoulli, (1700–1782), Dutch-Swiss mathematician
 Daniel Bertoni, Argentine association football player
 Daniel Bluman (born 1990), Colombian-born Israeli Olympic show jumping rider
 Daniel Bonjour (born 1981), South African actor
 Daniel Boone (1734–1820), American pioneer, fur trader, explorer, adventurer and hunter
 Daniel Brailovsky (born 1958), Argentinean-Uruguayan association football player (Argentina, Uruguay, & Israel national teams)
 Daniel Braverman (born 1993), American NFL football player
 Daniel Brühl (born 1978), German actor
 Daniel Brunhart, Liechtenstein judoka
 Daniel Brunskill (born 1994), American football player
 Daniel M. Buechlein, Benedictine monk
 Daniel Bukantz (1917–2008), American 4x US champion foil fencer
 Daniel Burley Woolfall, former President of FIFA
 Daniel "Cloud" Campos (born 1983), American dancer
 Daniel Carlson (born 1995), American football player
 Daniel Carriço, Portuguese association football player
 Daniel Castellani, Argentine volleyball player and coach
 Daniel Chamovitz (born 1963), American-Israeli biologist, author of What a Plant Knows, and President of Ben Gurion University of the Negev
 Daniel Chan, Hong Kong singer and actor
 Daniel Chițoiu, Romanian economist
 Daniel Ciobotea, Romanian Orthodox patriarch
 Daniel Clarkson, British comedy actor and playwright
 Daniel Clifford (born 1973), English chef
 Daniel Clitnovici (born 1982), Australian soccer coach
 Daniel Colla, Argentine volleyball player
 Daniel Coronell, Colombian director of Noticias Uno
 Daniel Craig (born 1968), English actor
 Daniel Cukierman (born 1995), Israeli tennis player
 Daniel John Cunningham, Scottish physician
 Daniel Dae Kim (born 1968), Korean-American actor
 Daniel Davis, American actor
 Daniel Day-Lewis (born 1957), retired English actor
 Daniël de Ridder (born 1984), Dutch association football player (Wigan Athletic & U21 national team)
 Daniel Defoe, English writer, journalist, and pamphleteer.
 Daniel Delfino, Argentine association football player
 Daniel de los Reyes, percussionist in American country music Zac Brown Band
 Daniel Dennett, American philosopher
 Daniel DeSanto, Canadian voice actor known for voicing Ray Kon, one of the main protagonists from the anime series Beyblade
 Daniel Dias Gunasekera, Sri Lankan Sinhala businessman and politician
 Daniel Drezner, American political scientist and author
 Daniel Dumile (1971–2020),  British-American rapper and beatmaker known as MF DOOM
 Daniel Ekuale (born 1994), American football player
 Daniel Ellsberg, American activist and former military analyst
 Daniel Gabriel Fahrenheit (1686–1736), European physicist, inventor, and scientific instrument maker
 Daniel Gómez Carrero (born 1990), Spanish singer
 Daniel Gutiérrez Castorena (born 1954), Mexican politician
 Daniel Fathers, British actor
 Daniel Fernandes, Portuguese-Canadian association football player
 Daniel Foster (disambiguation), one of several people
 Daniel Gafford, American basketball player
 Daniel Gibson, Cleveland Cavaliers guard
 Daniel Gilbert, American basketball player
 Daniel Georgievski, Macedonian footballer
 Daniel Greenstein, PSIA- snowboarder
 Daniel Güiza, Spanish association football player
 Daniel Gutman (1901-1993), American lawyer, state senator, state assemblyman, president justice of the municipal court, and law school dean.
 Daniel Gygax, Swiss association football player
 Daniel Harkness, author and Boise State University professor
 Daniel Harrison (disambiguation), one of several people
 Daniel Helm (born 1995), American football player
 Daniel Henney, Korean-American actor and model
 Daniel Heredia Abidal (born 1993), Spanish singer
 Daniel Hernández (disambiguation), multiple people
 Daniel Hershkowitz (born 1953), Israeli politician, mathematician, rabbi, and president of Bar-Ilan University
 Daniel Holtzclaw, convicted former American police officer
 Daniel Howell, English YouTube personality, comedian and former radio show host
 Daniel Hudson, American baseball pitcher
 Daniel Ingram (disambiguation), multiple people
 Daniel Inouye, American politician and World War II veteran
 Daniel Jarque, Spanish association football player
 Daniel H. Jenkins, American actor
 Daniel Johns, Australian vocalist, composer, guitarist and pianist
 Daniel Johnston, American singer-songwriter
 Daniel Jones (disambiguation), multiple people
 Daniel Jositsch (born 1965), Swiss law professor and politician
 Daniel Kahneman (born 1934), Israeli psychologist and Nobel laureate
 Daniel Kaluuya (born 1989), English actor and writer
 Daniel Kandi, Danish trance producer
 Daniel Kang, South Korean singer and member of boy group Wanna One
 Daniel Karrenberg (born 1959), German computer scientist
 Daniel Kelly (disambiguation), several people
 Daniel Kharitonov, Russian Pianist
 Daniel Kickert, Australian basketball player
 Daniel Killer, Argentine association football player
 Daniel Kinumbe, Canadian association football player
 Daniel Kitson, English comedian
 Daniel G. Knowlton (1922–2015), American bookbinder
 Daniel Koch (Swiss physician) (born 1955), Swiss physician
 Daniel Koperberg (born 1997), Israeli basketball player
 Daniel M. Krumrei, first chaplain to serve as an adjutant general
 Daniel Krutzen, Belgian association football player
 Daniel Küblböck, German pop-singer and actor
 Daniel C. Kurtzer (born 1949), American former diplomat
 Daniel Ato Kwamina Mensah (1953–2020), Ghanaian banker, economist and educator
 Daniel Lam (businessman), Hong Kong businessman
 Daniel Lara, subject of the 2016 Damn Daniel internet meme
 Daniel Larze (Filipino-Puerto Rican singer),Puerto Rican singer
 Daniel Lee (designer) (born 1986), English fashion designer
 Daniel Lee (film director), Hong Kong film director, screenwriter, assistant director, and art director
 Daniel Lee (triathlete) (born 1977), Hong Kong triathlete
 Daniel Levi (born 1961), French balladeer
 Daniel Lewis (disambiguation), several people
 Daniel Lewis Lee (1973–2020), American white supremacist and convicted murderer
 Daniel Liénard de Beaujeu, French Canadian officer during the Seven Years' War
 Daniel Lins Côrtes, Brazilian association football player
 Daniel López (footballer, born 1969), Chilean association football player
 Daniel Lozada, Peruvian economist and politician
 Daniel Lyon (wrestler) (born 1980), American professional wrestler
 Daniel Málek, Czech breaststroke swimmer
 Daniel Mameri, Brazilian water polo player
 Daniel Matsunaga (born 1988), Brazilian-Filipino model, actor, and host
 Daniel Mays (born 1978), English actor
 Daniel Calhoun McNair (born 1961), American businessman and sports executive
 Daniel Mendoza, English world champion Hall of Fame heavyweight boxer
 Daniel Middleton, British YouTuber and professional gamer
 Daniel Morgan, American Revolutionary War Brigadier General and politician
 Daniel John Morgan (1949–1987), private investigator who was murdered in London
 Daniel Mortimer, Australian Rugby League player
 Daniel Murphy (disambiguation), multiple people
 Daniel Negreanu, Romanian-Canadian professional poker player
 Daniel Niculae, Romanian association football player
 Daniel O'Donnell, Irish Gospel Singer, Country Musician & television presenter
 Daniel Ortega, Nicaraguan revolutionary and politician
 Daniel Oturu (born 1999), American basketball player
 Daniel Pacheco, Spanish association football player
 Daniel Padilla (born 1995), Filipino actor and recording artist
 Daniel Parslow, English association football player
 Daniel Passarella, Argentine association football player and manager
 Daniel Passino, American singer-songwriter
 Daniel Pliński, Polish volleyball player
 Daniel Poleshchuk (born 1996), Israeli squash player
 Daniel Portman (born 1992), Scottish actor
 Daniel Powter, Canadian singer
 Daniel Prenn (1904–1991), Russian-born German, Polish, and British world-top-ten tennis player
 Daniel Puente Encina, Chilean singer-songwriter, guitarist and film composer
 Daniel Radcliffe (born 1989), English actor
 Daniel Raditch, fictional character in Degrassi: The Next Generation
 Daniel Razon (born 1967), Filipino TV and Radio broadcaster, leader of Christian religious group Members Church of God International
 Daniël van der Ree (born 1972), Dutch politician
 Daniel Ramírez Romero (born 1995), Spanish singer
 Daniel G. Reid (1858 – 1925), American industrialist, financier, and philanthropist.
 Dan Reynolds (disambiguation), multiple people
 Daniel Ricciardo, Australian racing driver
 Daniel Rincón, Colombian road cyclist
 Daniel Rosenbaum (born 1997), American-Israeli basketball player in the Israel Basketball Premier League
 Daniel Rossen, American musician
 Daniel Roullier (born 1936/1937), French billionaire businessman
 Daniel Sackey (born 1994), Canadian basketball player
 Daniel Samohin (born 1998), Israeli Olympic figure skater
 Daniel Schlereth, baseball pitcher
 Daniel Santome Lemus "Dalas Review" (born 1993 Santa Cruz de Tenerife, Spain) Spanish YouTuber.
 Daniel Scott (disambiguation), multiple people
 Daniel Seavey, American musician
 Daniel Sedin, Swedish ice hockey player
 Daniel Sestrajcic (born 1976), Swedish politician
 Daniel Sharman, English actor
 Daniel Sirera, Spanish politician
 Daniel Sloss, Scottish comedian
 Daniel Steres (born 1990), American professional soccer player
 Daniel Sturridge, English association football player
 Daniel Suciu, Romanian politician
 Daniel M. Tani (born 1961), American astronaut
 Daniel Thomas (disambiguation), multiple people
 Daniel Thrasher, American YouTuber and musician
 Daniel Tillo (born 1996), American professional baseball player
 Daniel Tilton, American territorial judge
 Daniel D. Tompkins, 6th Vice President of the United States
 Daniel Tosh, American stand-up comedian and television presenter
 Daniel J. Travanti, American actor
 Daniel Tse, chair of the University Council of the University of Macau
 Daniel Tupou, Australian Rugby League player
 Daniel Tyerman (1773–1828), English missionary
 Daniel Van Buyten, Belgian international footballer
 Daniel Vasella (born 1953), Swiss businessman
 Daniel Vasilevski, Macedonian-Australian association football player
 Daniel Vencu Velasquez Castro (born 1994), Swedish politician
 Daniel Vidot (born 1990), Australian Rugby League player
 Daniel Webster (1782–1852), American statesman
 Daniel Webster (Florida politician), former Speaker of the Florida House of Representatives
 Daniel Webster Whittle (1840–1901), American gospel songwriter
 Daniel Weihs (born 1942), Israeli Aeronautical Engineering professor at the Technion – Israel Institute of Technology
 Daniel Westling (born 1973), Swedish prince and consort to Victoria, Crown Princess of Sweden
 Daniel H. Wilson, author, television host and robotics engineer
 Daniel Wise (American football) (born 1996), American football player
 Daniel Wu, American actor, director and producer based in Hong Kong
 Daniel Zajfman (born 1959), Israeli physicist; president of the Weizmann Institute
 Daniel Zovatto (born 1991), American actor

Daniele
 Daniele Barbaro, Patriarch of Aquileia

Daniels

"Daniels" is the form of the name "Danel" according to the Latvian grammar related to names.
 Daniels Bērziņš
 Daniels Ontužāns
 Daniels Pavļuts

Daniil
 Daniil Granin, Soviet/Russian writer
 Daniil Gleikhengauz, Russian ice dancer
 Daniil Kharms, early Soviet-era surrealist and absurdist poet, writer and dramatist
 Daniil Kvyat, Russian racing driver
 Daniil Simkin, soloist with American Ballet Theatre
 Daniil Medvedev, Russian tennis player
 Daniil Dubov, Russian Chess Player
 Daniil Trifonov, Russian Pianist

Danil
 Danil Yerdakov (born 1989), Russian ice hockey player

Danyl
 Danyl Johnson, British singer

Danny
 Danny (footballer), full name Danny Gomes, Portuguese association football player
 Danny!, American record producer/hip-hop performer
 Danny Ahn, Korean-American rapper and actor
 Danny Auerbach ("Solly Krieger"), American world champion middleweight boxer
 Danny Baker English DJ
 Danny Blind, Dutch association football player and manager
 Danny Briggs, English cricketer
 Danny Colbert, American football player
 Danny DeVito, American actor
 Danny Dyer, English actor
 Danny Elfman, American musician
 Danny Fernandes, Portuguese-Canadian singer-songwriter
 Danny Glover (born 1946), American actor
 Danny Guthrie, English association football player
 Danny Hay, New Zealand association football player
 Danny Ings, English football player
 Danny John-Jules, British actor and dancer
 Danny Jones, vocalist & guitarist, British band McFly
 Danny Kaye, American actor, singer, dancer, and comedian
 Danny La Rue, Irish-British entertainer
 Danny Murphy, English association football player
 Danny O'Donoghue (born 1980), Irish musician, lead singer of The Script
 Danny O'Reilly, Irish musician, lead singer of The Coronas
 Danny Saucedo (born 1986), Swedish pop/dance-singer
 Danny Schayes (born 1959), American basketball player, son of Dolph Schayes
 Danny Shittu, Nigerian association football player
 Danny Simpson, English association football player
 Danny Spradlin, American football player
 Danny Thomas, Welsh association football player
 Danny Valencia, American major league baseball third baseman (Minnesota Twins)
 Danny Van Zandt, fictional character in Degrassi: The Next Generation
 Danny Wallace, British author and humourist
 Danny Ward (born 1993), Welsh football player
 Danny Way, American professional skateboarder
 Danny Welbeck, English professional footballer
 Danny Wood, American singer, New Kids on the Block

Fictional Daniels 
 Daniel, a character from Rooster Teeth's Camp Camp
 Daniel Anderson, a character in the multimedia franchise Yo-kai Watch
 Daniel Bernstein, a character in the American TV miniseries V and V The Final Battle
 Daniel Blake, a character from the Ken Loach film  I, Daniel Blake
 Daniel Cook, title character from the children's series This is Daniel Cook
 Daniel "Danny" Delgado, the black ranger from Power Rangers: Wild Force
 Daniel "Danny" Fenton, title character from the animated series Danny Phantom
 Daniel Hall, the second incarnation of Dream of the Endless in the comic book The Sandman
 Daniel Hillard, the main character in the 1993 American comedy-drama movie Mrs. Doubtfire played by Robin Williams
 Daniel LaRusso, protagonist in The Karate Kid and its sequel Cobra Kai
 Daniel Jackson, a protagonist in the Stargate science fiction franchise
 Daniel, Jacob's brother in the Canadian animated series Jacob Two Two
 Daniel "Dan" Kuso, main protagonist of the anime series Bakugan: Battle Brawlers
 Daniel Marvin, a character in Captain Caution
 Daniel Morales, main protagonist of the movie series Taxi
 Daniel Plainview, the main character in Paul Thomas Anderson's 2008 drama film There Will Be Blood portrayed by Daniel Day-Lewis
 Daniel "Danny" Thaddeus Pickett, Andy Larkin's best friend and sidekick from the Canadian animated series What's With Andy?
 Daniel "Danny" Rand, the Marvel comic superhero knows as the Iron Fist
 Daniel Shaw, the main antagonist from the 3rd season of the NBC TV series Chuck
 Daniel "Danny" Tanner, main character from the sitcom Full House
 Daniel Witwicky, the protagonist of the Transformers series

Fictional Dans 
 Dan, a character in the 1986 TV action movie The Gladiator
 Dan Dare, a British science fiction comic hero
 Desperate Dan, a regular in The Dandy since 1937
 Dan Cahill, in The 39 Clues
 Dan Hibiki, in the Street Fighter Alpha series
 Dan Humphrey, in Gossip Girl
 Dan Kuso, the main protagonist from the Bakugan: Battle Brawlers anime series
 Dan Lewis, Doctor Who companion portrayed by John Bishop
 Dan McTavish, in The Ten Commandments (1923)
 Dan Moroboshi, alias of the title character in Ultraseven, a 1967 Japanese TV series
 Dan Sullivan, in EastEnders
 Dan Taylor, a character in the film Forrest Gump
 Dun Know Dan, a repair man played by Lawrence Ben Walters in the British web series Corner Shop Show

See also
 Danuel, given name

References 

Daniel